Shacklefords may refer to:

Shacklefords, Virginia
Shacklefords Fork, Virginia

See also
Shackleford (disambiguation)
Shackelford (disambiguation)